Cala Llenya or Cala Lleña is a small resort village and beach on the northeastern coast of Ibiza. Cala Llenya and Cala Boix often have "choppy waves." To the north is Cala Mastella.

References

Populated places in Ibiza
Beaches of Ibiza
Beaches of the Balearic Islands